Orthopaedic nursing (or orthopedic nursing) is a nursing specialty focused on the prevention and treatment of musculoskeletal disorders.  Orthopaedic issues range from acute problems such as fractures or hospitalization for joint replacement to chronic systemic disorders such as loss of bone density or lupus erythematosus.

Orthopaedic nurses have specialized skills such as neurovascular status monitoring, traction, continuous passive motion therapy, casting, and care of patients with external fixation.

Board certification
Certification in general orthopaedic nursing results in the designation "Orthopaedic Nurse Certified" (ONC).

Dates
 International Orthopaedic Nurses Day is October 30.
 Osteoporosis Awareness and Prevention Month is May.

See also

 Agnes Hunt, the pioneer of orthopaedic nursing
 National Association of Orthopaedic Nurses
 Journal of Orthopaedic Nursing
 Orthopaedic Nursing (journal)

References

External links
National Association of Orthopaedic Nurses website
Orthopaedic Nurses Certification Board website
 CORE Orthopaedic
 Institute of Orthopaedic Research & Fracture Surgery
RCN career and competency framework for orthopaedic and trauma nursing

Nursing specialties
Orthopedic treatment